Dénes Szántó was a Hungarian economist, who served as Governor of the Hungarian National Bank after the Hungarian Revolution of 1956, from 20 November 1956 to 30 June 1960.

See also
National Bank of Hungary

External links
 Heti Világgazdaság - Kik voltak eddig a Magyar Nemzeti Bank elnökei?

Governors of the Hungarian National Bank
Hungarian economists
Year of death missing
Year of birth missing